1999-2000 Portuguese football season.

Portuguese Liga

The 1999/2000 season of the Portuguese First Division began on August 20, 1999, and ended on May 14. Sporting CP became champions for the first time in eighteen years.

Promoted teams
These teams were promoted from the Portuguese Second Division of Honour at the start of the season:

Gil Vicente FC (2nd Division of Honour champions)
CF «Os Belenenses» (2nd placed)
CD Santa Clara (3rd placed)

Relegated teams
These teams were relegated to the Portuguese Second Division of Honour at the end of the season:

Vitória FC de Setúbal (16th placed)
Rio Ave FC (17th placed)
CD Santa Clara (18th placed)

Primeira Liga

 
Seasons in Portuguese football
Portugal
Football
Football